Kim Dae-mun (fl. early 8th century) was a Silla historian. He was the governor of Hansan in 704. According to book 46, biography section of Samguk Sagi, he wrote several books. Kim Dae-moon was a noble from Jingol. The period of survival is believed to span the units of King Sinmoon, King Hyoso and King Seongdeok.

Books 

 Tales from Gyerim (계림잡전, Gyerim is an old word for Silla)
 Records of Hansan(한산기)
 Biographies of Monks of the Ancient (고승전)
 Book of Music (악본)
 Annals of the Hwarang (Hwarang Segi) : A manuscript of Hwarang Segi was found in Gimhae, South Korea in 1980s, but its historical validity is not clear.

None of these works survive today.

See also
 History of Korea
 Unified Silla

References

Silla people
Historians of Korea
8th-century historians